The 2011 Samsung Securities Cup was a professional tennis tournament played on hard courts. It was the 12th edition and the 1st edition of the tournament which was part of the 2011 ATP Challenger Tour and the 2011 ITF Women's Circuit. It took place in Seoul, South Korea between 17 and 23 October 2011.

ATP entrants

Seeds

 1 Rankings are as of October 10, 2011.

Other entrants
The following players received wildcards into the singles main draw:
  Cho Soong-jae
  Chung Hong
  Nam Ji-sung
  Song Min-kyu

The following players received entry from the qualifying draw:
  Jeong Suk-young
  David Martin
  Toshihide Matsui
  Na Jung-woong

WTA entrants

Seeds

 1 Rankings are as of October 10, 2011.

Other entrants
The following players received wildcards into the singles main draw:
  Choi Ji-hee
  Ham Mi-rae
  Lee Se-jin
  Lee So-ra

The following players received entry from the qualifying draw:
  Chen Yi
  Kang Seo-kyung
  Kim Ji-young
  Kim Ju-eun
  Mai Minokoshi
  Yea Hyojung
  Yuan Yue
  Zhang Yuxuan

Champions

Men's singles

 Lu Yen-hsun def.  Jimmy Wang, 7–5, 6–3

Women's singles

 Hsieh Su-wei def.  Yurika Sema, 6–1, 6–0

Men's doubles

 Sanchai Ratiwatana /  Sonchat Ratiwatana def.  Purav Raja /  Divij Sharan, 6–4, 7–6(7–3)

Women's doubles

 Kang Seo-kyung /  Kim Na-ri def.  Kim Ji-young /  Yoo Mi, 5–7, 6–1, [10–7]

External links
Official Website
Men's ITF Search
Women's ITF Search
ATP official site

Samsung Securities Cup
Samsung Securities Cup
Samsung Securities Cup
Samsung